Nelson's Column is a British comedy television series first broadcast between 17 February 1994 and 31 July 1995.

External links
 
 
 BBC Comedy Guide – explains the show's premise

BBC television sitcoms
1994 British television series debuts
1995 British television series endings
1990s British sitcoms
Television shows set in Buckinghamshire
English-language television shows